Partition and secession in the United States may refer to:

 Secession in the United States
 List of U.S. state partition proposals